WKLF (1000 AM, "The Peach") is a radio station licensed to serve the community of Clanton, Alabama. The station is owned by WKLF LLC. It airs a Southern gospel and oldies format.

The station was assigned the WKLF call letters by the Federal Communications Commission on March 4, 1947.

Marion W. Easterling hosted a gospel radio show on WKLF.

References

External links
 Official Website
 FCC Public Inspection File for WKLF
 

KLF
Radio stations established in 1948
1948 establishments in Alabama
KLF
Southern Gospel radio stations in the United States
Oldies radio stations in the United States
Chilton County, Alabama